Chrysis may refer to:
 Chrysis (wasp), a genus of cuckoo wasps in the family Chrysididae
An ancient Greek personal name (as a female name: , as a male name); in particular:
 Chrysis (priestess), priestess who caused the destruction of the Heraion of Argos in 423 BC
 Chrysis, the eponymous girl from Samos in the play Samia by Menander
 Chrysis, the eponymous girl from Andros in the play Andria by Terence
 Chrysis, the courtesan in the novel Aphrodite: mœurs antiques by Pierre Louÿs
 Chrysis, a mistress of Demetrius I of Macedon according to Plutarch's Lives

See also
Chrysis Painter, a 5th-century BC Attic vase painter
Crysis, a video game
Crisis (disambiguation)